Lee Sang-don (born December 4, 1951) is a South Korean legal scholar and a conservative liberal political activist. His liberal philosophy was influenced by American conservatism and neoconservatism, but he is critical of South Korean conservatism. He currently works as a professor at Chung-Ang University. He is a conservative pundit well known for expressing criticisms towards the Lee Myung-bak government. He received criticisms from a group of pro-Lee Myung-bak lawmakers for participating in the restructure of the Saenuri Party (formally Grand National Party) in the past due to his distance with Lee Myung-bak.

He was a member of the National Assembly member of the People's Party, a liberal political party led by Ahn Cheol-soo.

Early life
Sang-don was born in Busan. He graduated in Seoul National University with a B.A. and M.A. in law and later received his Ph.D from Tulane University in law.

Remarks

On Lee Myung-bak
 He is critical against the real estate cover-ups made by the South Korean President, Lee Myung-bak, in Naegok-dong, Seocho-gu, Seoul.
 He had expressed concerns through his blog how Lee Myung-bak's political associates could potentially drag down the Lee Myung-bak government and his affiliated Saenuri Party (then Grand National Party) after the next presidential election due to Lee's extensive history of political corruptions.
 He once said in 2010 that Lee Myung-bak and Park Geun-hye should have separated on their own way because "Lee Myung-bak's leadership heads itself to a potential Watergate scandal-like incident". This incident refers to the South Korean illegal surveillance incident. Lee Myung-bak has been politically isolated from the ruling Saenuri Party as Chairperson Hong Jun-pyo, resigned.

On the Supreme Prosecutors' Office
 He proposed an extensive restructure of the Supreme Prosecutors' Office of the Republic of Korea as the organization itself covers up the corruptions generated by officials in the Lee Myung-bak government.

Incidents
On April 4, 2012, Lee abruptly left a live political debate program shown in tvN Asia that generated controversies.

Works
 Lee, Sang-don, 세계의 트렌드를 읽는 100권의 책, 기파랑 (2006), 
 Lee, Sang-don, 비판적 환경주의자, 브레인북스 (2006), 
 Lee, Sang-don, 위기에 처한 대한민국, 경덕출판사 (2007), 
 Lee, Sang-don, 조용한 혁명, 뷰스 (2011),

See also 
 Liberalism in South Korea
 William F. Buckley Jr.
 Neoconservatism

References

External links
  Official Website
  Naver Profile

1951 births
Asian conservative liberals
Living people
People from Busan
Academic staff of Chung-Ang University
Liberalism in South Korea
Tulane University alumni
Seoul National University School of Law alumni